In mathematics, particularly set theory, non-recursive ordinals are large countable ordinals greater than all the recursive ordinals, and therefore can not be expressed using ordinal collapsing functions.

The Church–Kleene ordinal and variants 
The smallest non-recursive ordinal is the Church Kleene ordinal, named after Alonzo Church and S. C. Kleene; its order type is the set of all recursive ordinals. Since the successor of a recursive ordinal is recursive, the Church–Kleene ordinal is a limit ordinal. It is also the smallest ordinal that is not hyperarithmetical, and the smallest admissible ordinal after  (an ordinal α is called admissible if .)

The relativized Church–Kleene ordinal  is the supremum of the x-computable ordinals. 

, first defined by Stephen G. Simpson and dubbed the "Great Church–Kleene ordinal" is an extension of the Church–Kleene ordinal. This is the smallest limit of admissible ordinals, yet this ordinal is not admissible. Alternatively, this is the smallest α such that  is a model of -comprehension.

Recursively ordinals 
Recursively "x" ordinals, where "x" typically represents a large cardinal property, are kinds of nonrecursive ordinals.

An ordinal  is called recursively inaccessible if it is admissible and a limit of admissibles ( is the th admissible ordinal). Alternatively, it is recursively inaccessible if , an extension of Kripke–Platek set theory stating that each set is contained in a model of Kripke–Platek set theory, an ordinal  such that  is the th admissible ordinal, or such that  is a model of -comprehension. 

An ordinal  is called recursively hyperinaccessible if it is recursively inaccessible and a limit of recursively inaccessibles, or where  is the th recursively inaccessible. Like "hyper-inaccessible cardinal", different authors conflict on this terminology.

An ordinal  is called recursively Mahlo if it is admissible and for any -recursive function  there is an admissible  such that  (that is,  is closed under ).

An ordinal  is called recursively weakly compact if it is -reflecting, or equivalently, 2-admissible. These ordinals have strong recursive Mahloness properties, if α is  -reflecting then  is recursively -Mahlo.

Weakenings of stable ordinals 
An ordinal  is stable if . There are various weakenings of stable ordinals:

 A countable ordinal  is called -stable iff . 
 The smallest -stable ordinal is much larger than the smallest recursively weakly compact ordinal: it has been shown that the smallest -stable ordinal is -reflecting for all finite .
 In general, a countable ordinal  is called -stable iff .
 A countable ordinal  is called -stable iff , where  is the smallest admissible ordinal . The smallest -stable ordinal is again much larger than the smallest -stable or the smallest -stable for any constant .
 A countable ordinal  is called -stable iff , where  are the two smallest admissible ordinals . The smallest -stable ordinal is larger than the smallest -reflecting.
 A countable ordinal  is called inaccessibly-stable iff , where  is the smallest recursively inaccessible ordinal . The smallest inaccessibly-stable ordinal is larger than the smallest -stable.
 A countable ordinal  is called Mahlo-stable iff , where  is the smallest recursively Mahlo ordinal . The smallest Mahlo-stable ordinal is larger than the smallest inaccessibly-stable.
 A countable ordinal  is called doubly -stable iff . The smallest doubly -stable ordinal is larger than the smallest Mahlo-stable.

Larger nonrecursive ordinals 

 The least ordinal  such that  where  is the smallest nonprojectible ordinal.
 The least ordinal  such that . This ordinal has been characterized by Toshiyasu Arai.
 The least ordinal  such that .
 The least stable ordinal.

References

Proof theory
Ordinal numbers